Ẽ, ẽ is a letter in which the tilde indicates a nasal vowel or nasal consonant.

Usage 
In the International Phonetic Alphabet,  represents a nasalized  sound. It is the 5th letter in the Guaraní alphabet and widely used in other Amerindian languages in Brazil, such as Kaingang, representing this nasalized  sound. It is also used for the Bantu language Umbundu.

In Emilian-Romagnol, ẽ is used to represent [ẽː], e.g. galẽna [gaˈlẽːna] ("hen").

In Vietnamese, it is used to represent an E with a ngã tone.

Commonly found in medieval and Renaissance-era texts, both in Latin and vernacular languages such as Old Spanish and Middle French, standing for en and em before a consonant or at the end of a word. For example, Old Spanish tiẽpo for tiempo, riẽdas for riendas, fazẽ for fazen.

In older Italian documents, a tilde is used to indicate a missing m after a vowel. So, ẽ is used to abbreviate em, as in tẽpo instead of tempo

Computer encoding

References 

E-tilde
E-tilde